In quantum field theory, soft-collinear effective theory (or SCET) is a theoretical framework for doing calculations that involve interacting particles carrying widely different energies.

The motivation for developing SCET was to control the infrared divergences that occur in quantum chromodynamics (QCD) calculations that involve particles that are soft—carrying much lower energy or momentum than other particles in the process—or collinear—traveling in the same direction as another particle in the process. SCET is an effective theory for highly energetic quarks interacting with collinear and/or soft gluons.  It has been used for calculations of the decays of B mesons (quark-antiquark bound states involving a bottom quark) and the properties of jets (sprays of hadrons that emerge from particle collisions when a quark or gluon is produced). SCET has also been used to calculate electroweak interactions in Higgs boson production.

The new feature of SCET is its ability to handle more than one soft energy scale.  For example, processes involving quarks carrying a high energy Q interacting with gluons have two soft scales: the transverse momentum pT of the collinear particles, plus the even softer scale pT2/Q.  SCET provides a power-counting formalism for doing perturbation theory in the small parameter ΛQCD/Q.

External links 

See the original papers were by Christian Bauer, Sean Fleming, Michael Luke, Dan Pirjol, and Iain Stewart:

References

Quantum chromodynamics